Philotheca citrina is a species of flowering plant in the family Rutaceae and is endemic to Western Australia. It is a much-branched shrub with curved, narrow club-shaped leaves and pale yellowish green flowers arranged singly on the ends of branchlets.

Description
The ten stamens are hairy and fused together in the lower part. Flowering occurs from May to September.

Taxonomy and naming
Philotheca citrina was first formally described in 1992 by Paul Wilson in the journal Nuytsia from specimens collected by Raymond Jeffrey Cranfield in the Murchison region.

Distribution and habitat
This species of philotheca grows on granitic breakaway country in the Muchison River area east of Shark Bay.

Conservation status
This species is classified as is classified as "Priority One" by the Government of Western Australia Department of Parks and Wildlife, meaning that it is known from only one or a few locations which are potentially at risk.

References

citrina
Flora of Western Australia
Sapindales of Australia
Plants described in 1992
Taxa named by Paul G. Wilson